Paul Braniff (born 1982) is an Irish hurler who currently plays as a full-forward for the Down senior team.

Braniff made his first appearance for the team during the 2000 championship and has remained as a regular member of the team since then. Although he has won a Ulster medals at under-21 level, Braniff has enjoyed little success with the Down senior team. Braniff scored 3–9 in the National Hurling League Division 2 Final in 2004 where Down beat Westmeath 5–15 to 3–07. Braniff led Down to their first Christy Ring Cup in 2013 in a 3–16 to 2–17 over Kerry with a Gareth 'Magic' Johnson goal in injury-time goal won it for the Ardsmen.

At club level Braniff is a five-time county championship medalist with Portaferry.

He is well known as Down best player for many years, and many people think he was and maybe still is the best player in Ulster. He captained Portaferry and County Down in 2010.

References

Career statistics

Club

Honours
Portaferry
Down Senior Hurling Championship (6): 2000, 2001, 2002, 2006, 2012, 2014
Down Minor Hurling Championship (3): 1997 1998 1999
Ulster Senior Hurling Championship (1): 2014
Down
Ulster Under-21 Hurling Championship (1): 2003 (c)
National Hurling League Division 2 (1): 2004
Christy Ring Cup (1): 2013 (c)
Awards
Christy Ring Cup All-Stars (3): 2010 2011 2012

1983 births
Living people
Portaferry hurlers
Down inter-county hurlers
Ulster inter-provincial hurlers